The men's artistic gymnastics individual all-around competition at the 2012 Summer Olympics was held at the North Greenwich Arena on 28 July and 1 August 2012. It included 41 competitors from 27 nations.

Kōhei Uchimura of Japan won the gold medal, his nation's first victory in the men's all-around since 1984 and its fifth overall. (At that point, Japan was second to the Soviet Union, whose gymnasts won the event six times; Uchimura would win again in 2016, bringing the two nations even.) Uchimura was the 14th man to earn multiple all-around medals, adding to his silver from 2008.

Germany's Marcel Nguyen earned silver, the first men's all-around medal for a German gymnast (including the United Team of Germany, East Germany, and West Germany) since the 1936 Games in Berlin. Danell Leyva of the United States took bronze.

Background

This was the 26th appearance of the men's individual all-around in the Olympics. The event was first held in 1900 and has been included in every Games since then.

Two of the top 10 gymnasts from the 2008 Games returned in 2012: Uchimura and seventh-place finisher Fabian Hambüchen of Germany. Uchimura had won the past three World Championships and was the favorite coming into the Games.

Azerbaijan made its debut in the event. France made its 24th appearance, the most of any nation.

Qualification process

Qualification for the 2012 Olympics was based primarily on the 2011 World Artistic Gymnastics Championships. The top 8 teams at the world championships could send a full team of 5 gymnasts to the Olympics. The teams ranked 9th through 16th competed in the 2012 Gymnastics Olympic Test Event, where the top 4 finishers also qualified full teams for the Olympics.

The individual apparatus medalists from the World Championships also qualified, if their nation had not already qualified a team. The FIG Executive Board made invitational selections to ensure host country and continental representation, and the Tripartite Commission made an invitation. The remainder of the quota of 98 gymnasts was filled through the individual all-around rankings at the Test Event, with only one gymnast per nation able to qualify in that manner.

At the Games, the top 24 competitors in the qualification phase (with a limit of two per country), based on combined scores on all six apparatuses, advanced to the individual all-around final. The finalists performed on each apparatus again. Qualification scores were then ignored, with only final-round scores counting.

Results

Qualifying

Only two gymnasts per country were allowed to advance to the all-around final. The following gymnasts finished in the top 24 in the qualifying round but did not advance because of the two-per-country rule:
  (17th place)
  (20th place)
  (26th place)

Kazuhito Tanaka (22nd place) was initially excluded by the two-per-country rule as well, but advanced to the final after his teammate Koji Yamamuro was injured on vault during the men's team competition.

Final

Number in brackets indicates rank in the event.

References

Gymnastics at the 2012 Summer Olympics
2012
Olympics
Men's events at the 2012 Summer Olympics

pl:Gimnastyka na Letnich Igrzyskach Olimpijskich 2012 - ćwiczenia wolne mężczyzn